"Unbreakable" is the debut single by Austrian singer Conchita Wurst. The song was released in Austria as a digital download on 22 November 2011 through Sony Music Entertainment. The song peaked at number 32 in Austria.

Track listing

Charts

Release history

References

2011 songs
2011 singles
Conchita Wurst songs